Charlton Athletic Women's Football Club (CAWFC) play in the . Founded in 1991 as Bromley Borough, later under the name Croydon Women's F.C., between 2000–2007 as Charlton Athletic, the club was one of the most successful women's teams in England. 

After the parent club's relegation from the Premier League, the women's team was controversially disbanded in the summer of 2007, causing almost all of the senior squad to depart, although later a rescue sponsorship package was formed allowing the women's set up to continue. 

CAWFC won the FA Women's Premier League Southern Division title in 2017–18. On 27 May 2018, they beat Northern Division champions Blackburn Rovers Ladies FC 2–1 in a play-off final at Bramall Lane, Sheffield, and thus gained promotion to the FA Women's Championship, the second tier of women's football, for the season 2018–19.

History

Bromley Borough
The team was formed in 1991 as Bromley Borough by disaffected members of Millwall Lionesses' WFA Cup winning squad.

The team broke up in the aftermath of that success Hope Powell moved with team mate Sue Law to form a new club. They were initially led by Richard Hall with the support of Dan "Le Phyz" Kane. Beginning in the South East Counties League, the club quickly progressed through the divisions. After adding England player Brenda Sempare in 1992, Bromley Borough won all 16 matches in the South East Counties League Division One, scoring 142 goals in the process. The team also reached the semi final of the Women's FA Cup, where they lost 2–0 to treble-winning Arsenal.

In 1993–94 Bromley Borough won the National League Division One South by ten points, securing promotion into the top flight of English women's football. Although they were handed a chastening 10–1 defeat by Doncaster Belles in the fifth round of the FA Women's Cup

Following a swift rise through the divisions, the club won promotion into the National Premier League.

Croydon
The club entered the top-flight as Croydon, having tied up with Croydon FC. Debbie Bampton was appointed player-manager in the 1994 close season. She built a strong team which supplied six of England's squad for the 1995 FIFA Women's World Cup including Kerry Davis as well as Bampton, Powell and Sempare. After securing a fourth-placed finish in 1994–95, in 1995–96 Bampton led the team to a domestic double. After losing both domestic Cup finals to Arsenal Ladies in 1998, the club recaptured the League title in 1999. Another League and FA Women's Cup double followed in 2000.

Takeover
At Croydon's AGM in June 2000, the club's players controversially voted to accept a hostile takeover from Charlton Athletic. Bampton resigned as manager, as both the club's committee and the FA declared affiliation with the men's Premier League club to be against the rules. The Croydon F.C. chairman, Ken Jarvie, also attempted to block the move which was eventually sanctioned.

Charlton Athletic
The club's first silverware under the new name came in the same year when the Charity Shield was shared with Arsenal, after the match resulted in a draw. Charlton reached the FA Cup final in 2003 but lost 3–0 to Fulham. In the following season (2003–04) Charlton finished runners-up in the Premier League, just one point behind winners Arsenal, and again reached the F.A. Cup final which they lost to Arsenal. The season did bring success to the club, though, with a victory over Fulham in the final of the League Cup. In 2004–05, Charlton won both the Charity Shield (beating Arsenal) and the FA Cup (beating Everton) and once more finished runners up in the league to Arsenal. In 2005–06, Charlton regained the League Cup, beating Arsenal in the Final. However, in this season, and also the 2006–07 season, Charlton finished third in the league, meaning the club missed the opportunity to participate in the UEFA Cup. In May 2007, Charlton were again runners up in the FA Cup, losing to Arsenal in the final. During these successful years under manager Keith Boanas and assistant Matt Beard, the team included several current and former England internationals, notably club captain Casey Stoney, goalkeeper Pauline Cope, Joanne Broadhurst, Eniola Aluko and Katie Chapman. Aluko and Chapman went on to play professionally in the United States.

Controversial disbandment
The same day as the 2007 FA Cup final, Charlton Athletic's men's team was relegated from the Premier League. It became evident that, in order to ensure the club's financial survival, a number of budget cuts would have to be enacted. On 23 June 2007 it was announced that Charlton's women's set up would form part of this. This decision was criticised by, among others, several of the club's players at the time, including Casey Stoney and Danielle Murphy. Charlton's chief executive, Peter Varney, defended the decision and pointed to the lack of exposure in the media and lack of funding given to the women's game from the Football Association as reasons for undertaking the decision.

Resurrection
On 22 August 2007, it was announced sponsorship had been secured by Charlton for the women's set up, allowing a senior side to continue to compete under Charlton's name. The women's team, now controlled by the Charlton Community Trust, the organisation which operates Charlton's community programmes, appointed former Charlton player Paul Mortimer as the women's team's new coach. However, due to the exodus of players after the original closure announcement, only two players from the previous squad remained by the time the club's rescue was in place although a few more returned as the season progressed. The reconstituted team finished bottom of the National Division of the FA Women's Premier League at the end of the 2007–08 season, thereby relegating them to the League's Southern Division. The team stabilised at this level and a reserve team was successfully re-established, twice winning the Kent Women's Cup in 2008–09 and 2010–11. The first team were promoted back to the National Division at the end of the 2010–11 season as Southern Division champions.

Rehabilitation

Following an unsuccessful bid to enter the new Women's Super League that was formed in 2013–14, the club has played in the FA Women's Premier League, Southern Division. An FA requirement at the time of the bid was that applicant clubs were to be a separate legal entity. This led to the formation of Charlton Athletic Women's Football Club Limited on 9 February 2013. The majority shareholder is Stephen King, CEO of PHSC plc.  CAWFC won the FA Women's Premier League Cup in 2015, beating Sheffield FC 4–2 on penalties after it was 0–0 at the end of extra time in a match held at Nuneaton Borough FC's ground. The club made the final again in 2017 but were defeated by Tottenham Hotspur Ladies 4–3 on penalties after a scoreless match and extra time.

Players

Current squad

Former players

Management

 Chairman: Thomas Sandgaard
 Secretary: Susan Prior
 General Manager: Gabriel John
 Head coach: Karen Hills
 First team coach: Riteesh Mishra
 Head of sports medicine and physiotherapy: Simon Webster

Honours

League
FA Women’s Premier League National Division
Runners-up (2): 2003–04, 2004–05

FA Women's National League Southern Division
Champions (2): 2010–11, 2017–18
Runners-up (1): 2015–16

FA Women's Premier League
Play-off winners (1): 2017–18

Cup
FA Cup
Winners (1): 2004–05
Runners up (3): 2002–03, 2003–04, 2006–07

League Cup 
Winners (2): 2003–04, 2005–06
Runners-up (1): 2004–05

FA Women's Community Shield 
Winners (2): 2000, 2004

Premier League Cup
Winners (1): 2014–15
Runners up (1): 2016–17

London Cup 
Winners (4): 2003, 2005, 2006, 2013

London Capital Senior Cup 
Winners (5): 2014, 2015, 2016, 2017, 2018

London Capital Intermediate Cup 
Winners (1): 2016

Isthmian Cup 
Winners (1): 2015
Runners-up (3): 2016, 2017, 2018

Kent County Cup 
Winners (3): 2003, 2009, 2011

References

External links 
Official site

 
Women
Women's football clubs in England
Women's football clubs in London
1991 establishments in England
2000 establishments in England
1994 establishments in England
FA Women's National League teams
Association football clubs established in 1991
Association football clubs established in 2000
Association football clubs established in 1994